Cetoscarus ocellatus, common name Spotted parrotfish, is a species of parrotfish belonging to the family Scaridae.

Taxonomy
This species was formerly considered to be the same species as Cetoscarus bicolor, which is otherwise restricted to the Red Sea; however, there are major morphological and molecular differences between the two species, so the IUCN Red List has recognized them as separate species since 2010. This species is sometimes known as the bicolour parrotfish, but this name also is applied to C. bicolor. C. ocellatus currently encompasses the Pacific and Indian Ocean populations and these are presently considered to be conspecific. However, molecular studies indicate that the Indian Ocean population is probably specifically distinct from the Pacific population, if this is the case then the Indian Ocean species would be Cetoscarus nigropinnis.

Etymology
The species name ocellatus refers to the dark ocellus on the dorsal fin of juveniles.

Distribution 
Cetoscarus ocellatus is widespread in the coastal waters of Indian and Pacific Oceans. These fishes are found along the southern east coast of Africa, from Somalia to South Africa, in Australia and in Southeast Asia (The Coral Triangle region) and north to southern Japan.

Habitat 
 They vary in habitat. Some prefer coral reefs, while some prefer seagrass beds, algal beds, mangroves and rocky reefs.

Description 
This species has a long snout and shows 14-15 pectoral rays;, 5-7 median predorsal scales and  3 rows of scales on cheek. The color of the Cetoscarus ocellatus  varies between genders as well as between adults and juveniles.

Juveniles are usually white with a thick orange band that surrounds the head, except snout and chin. They have a black circular spot on their dorsal fin and a thick orange band on their rounded tail.

Females of the initial phase have a dark purple to reddish brown head, finely spotted with black ventrally. Body shows dorsally a broad, pale yellowish zonewhile below it is bluish gray. Scales are rimmed and spotted with black. Median fins are brownish red and caudal with a whitish crescent posteriorly.

The brightly-coloured terminal males are green, scales are rimmed with pink, head and anterior body show numerous small pink spots. An orange line is running from mouth to anal fin.

Biology
Cetoscarus ocellatus is a hermaphroditic member of the Parrotfish family. It is found largely within the Coral Triangle region, although it has been found to inhabit sea grass and algal beds as well as mangroves. As these Parrot Fishes are hermaphrodites, they start out as females  (the 'initial phase') and eventually can become males. They travel in large schools that are led by one dominant male followed by females. If for some reason this male were to leave or get separated, one of the dominant females of the group will take charge and change its gender and color. Parrotfish are important to the dynamic of coral reefs and are being threatened by overfishing, and destruction of habitat due to climate change.

Threats 
In the Coral Triangle Region fish are being threatened by overfishing, destruction of habitat and destructive fishing practices. Due to climate change, their habitats are being destroyed. This is detrimental due to the fact that parrot fish are important to the dynamic of coral reefs.

The family of parrot fishes is extremely big with about 80 different species. Due to the impact that humans are having on their habitat a study was conducted on genetic diversity to see which type of parrot fish had the highest genetic diversity (the one with the highest genetic variation is the one that will most likely survive drastic changes in the environment). In this article we were able to find out that Cetoscarus ocellatus had one of the lowest values of genetic diversity. This means that with climate change happening and the destruction of their habitat the bicolour parrotfish is less likely to adapt and more likely to die.

As this fishes are kept in aquariums, they are also more likely to get infected with parasites due to the water in the tanks. A study conducted in Vietnam to test certain fish for the parasite Cryptocaryon irritans. They tested 14 fish and 8 caught the parasite, meaning 57.14% of them are likely to catch this parasite. They were able to see that spring had the highest prevalence followed by winter and the summer (with only 20%). This information is important for aquariums to keep in mind, so they are able to treat their waters a certain manner before the parasite can get to the fish.

Corallivory 
Corallivory refers to animals that eat coral polyps. All parrot fishes feed on coral, but the corallivory within the parrot fishes may depend on the local environment and the species of coral present. An experiment by Bellwood and Choat in 1990 showed that Cetoscarus ocellatus take 10% fewer bites of live coral in the Great Barrier reef compared to other parrot fishes.

References

External links
 Sealife Collection

ocellatus
Fish of the Pacific Ocean
Fish of the Indian Ocean
Taxa named by Achille Valenciennes
Fish described in 1840